The following elections occurred in the year 1925.

Asia 
 1925 Philippine House of Representatives elections
 1925 Philippine Senate elections
 1925 Philippine legislative election

Europe
 1925 Belgian general election
 1925 Dutch general election
 1925 Czechoslovakian parliamentary election
 1925 Irish Seanad election
 1925 Kingdom of Serbs, Croats and Slovenes parliamentary election
 1925 Portuguese legislative election
 1925 Luxembourgian legislative election
 1925 Norwegian local elections

Germany
 1925 German presidential election

United Kingdom
 1925 Eastbourne by-election
 1925 Galloway by-election
 1925 Northern Ireland general election
 1925 Oldham by-election
 1925 Stockport by-election
 1925 University of Oxford Chancellor election

United Kingdom local

English local
 1925 Southwark Borough election

North America
 1925 Guatemalan parliamentary election

Canada
 1925 Canadian federal election
 1925 Edmonton municipal election
 1925 New Brunswick general election
 1925 Nova Scotia general election
 1925 Saskatchewan general election
 1925 Toronto municipal election
 1925 Yukon general election

Oceania

Australia
 1925 Australian federal election
 1925 New South Wales state election
 1925 Tasmanian state election
 1925 Western Australian prohibition referendum

New Zealand
 1925 New Zealand general election
 1925 Franklin by-election

South America 
 1925 Chilean presidential election
 1925 Uruguayan National Administration Council election on 8 February 1925, a partial election to renew three of the seats of the National Administration Council. 
 1925 Uruguayan parliamentary election on 29 November 1925

See also
 :Category:1925 elections

References 

1925
Elections